= Mekonge Integral Ecological Reserve =

Coordinates: 4.108°N 9.044°E

The Mekonge Integral Ecological Reserve is found in Cameroon, and covers 26.44 km^{2}.
